Akira Mitake (見岳 章; born November 11, 1956) is a Japanese composer from Tokyo.

Mitake composed , Like the Flow of the River, a song recorded by Japanese enka singer Hibari Misora.

References 
http://www.last.fm/music/Mitake+Akira

1956 births
20th-century Japanese composers
21st-century Japanese composers
Japanese male composers
Living people
Musicians from Tokyo
20th-century Japanese male musicians
21st-century Japanese male musicians